Man About Town is a 1932 American drama film directed by John Francis Dillon and written by Leon Gordon. The film stars Warner Baxter, Karen Morley, Conway Tearle, Alan Mowbray, Leni Stengel and Lilian Bond. The film was released on May 22, 1932, by Fox Film Corporation.

Cast 
Warner Baxter as Stephen Morrow
Karen Morley as Helena
Conway Tearle as Bob Ashley
Alan Mowbray as Ivan Boris
Leni Stengel as Countess Vonesse
Lilian Bond as Carlotta Cortez
Lawrence Grant as Count Vonesse
Halliwell Hobbes as Hilton

References

External links 
 

1932 films
Fox Film films
American drama films
1932 drama films
Films directed by John Francis Dillon
American black-and-white films
1930s English-language films
1930s American films